Al-Aqsa University is a Palestinian university established in 1955 in the Gaza Strip, Palestine. Established in 1955 as the first higher education institution in the Gaza Strip, Al-Aqsa University is the oldest governmental higher education institution. It caters for some 26,000 students and has some 1400 employees, 300 of whom are lecturers and professors.

Faculties
Faculty of Applied Sciences 
Faculty of Art and Human sciences 
Faculty of Education 
Faculty of Fine Arts
Faculty of Media
Faculty of Management and Financing
Faculty of Sports
Faculty of Information Technology

The 8 faculties offer bachelor's degrees with postgraduate studies on a joint program, established in 1994, between Al-Aqsa University and Ain Shams University, Egypt. The program is on hold now, but there are master's degree programs in a number of faculties in the university.

See also
 List of universities and colleges in Palestine
 Education in Palestine

Notes

References
Medea’s information files: Palestinian Universities

External links
University Homepage

Educational institutions established in 1955
Gaza City
Universities and colleges in Gaza Strip
Temple Mount